Jörg De Bernardi (born 1973) is a Swiss diplomat and politician. He held the office of Vice-Chancellor of Switzerland between August 2016 and December 2018, in charge of the Federal Council's affairs.

After growing up in the Canton of Ticino, De Bernardi graduated at the faculty of Theology at the University of Neuchâtel in 1998, and followed up with a master's degree in Applied Ethics at the University of Zürich in 2002.
He joined the diplomatic service of the Swiss Federal Department of Foreign Affairs in 2003, and was stationed in Bern and Addis Ababa. Between 2008 and 2011, he worked within the WTO section of the Federal Department of Economic Affairs, Education and Research.

In March 2011, the Canton of Ticino named De Bernardi their delegate for relations with the Federal Government. The Federal Council named him Vice-Chancellor of Switzerland on 5 June 2016, as the successor to Thomas Helbling. He held the office since August that same year, and was in charge of managing the Federal Councils' meetings, as well as seven organizational units within the Federal Chancellery. De Bernardi was the first representative of the Canton of Ticino within the Federal Government in 17 years, since Flavio Cotti's retirement. In August 2018, he announced his resignation from the post for April 2019, citing family reasons, but continues working within the Federal Chancellery in a different capacity.

References 

Social Democratic Party of Switzerland politicians
1973 births
Living people